Mustafa Aydogan (born 1957) is a contemporary Kurdish writer and translator. He was born in the district of Kızıltepe in Mardin in southeastern Turkey and relocated to Sweden in 1985. He has translated works of renowned authors such as Jack London, Yaşar Kemal, Aziz Nesin and Orhan Pamuk into Kurdish.

Books
Zaroka şevê, Translation of Children of the Frost by Jack London, 82 pp.,  Nûdem Publishers, Stockholm, 1995.
Pêlên bêrîkirinê (Novel), 171 pp., Nûdem Publishers, Stockholm, 1997, .
Siltanê Fîlan, Translation of Filler Sultanı by Yaşar Kemal, 239 pp., Nûdem Publishers, Stockholm, 1998, .
Fîl Hemdî, Translation of Fil Hamdi by Aziz Nesin, Doz Publishers, Istanbul, 1999.
Siwaro, Translation of a work by Edip Karahan, 63 pp., Nûdem Publishers, Stockholm, 2001, .
Kurdistan : wêne, Translation of Kurdistan fotografier by Ann Eriksson,  172 pp., Almlöf Publishers, Stockholm, 2001, .
Berê gotin hebû, Collection of articles, 207 pp.,  Doz Publishers, Istanbul, 2001, .
Navê Min Sor e, Translation of Benim Adım Kırmızı by Orhan Pamuk, 586 pp., Nefel/Doz Publishers, Stockholm/Istanbul, 2002, .
Ferhenga Swêdî-Kurdî (Kurmancî) (Swedish-Kurdish Dictionary), with Mahmûd Lewendî and Vîldan Tanrikulu, Published by Myndigheten för skolutveckling, Sweden, 1074 pp., 2006, .

References

Kurdish-language writers
Translators to Kurdish
1957 births
Living people